Alpheus bisincisus , the flathead snapping shrimp or red snapping shrimp, is a species of snapping shrimp found in the Indo-West Pacific.

References

External links

Alpheidae
Crustaceans described in 1844
Taxa named by Wilhem de Haan